Giuseppe Paris (22 September 1895 – 5 April 1968) was an Italian gymnast who competed at the 1920 Summer Olympics, the 1924 Summer Olympics and the 1928 Summer Olympics. He was born in Milan. He was part of the Italian team, which was able to win the gold medal in the gymnastics men's team, European system event in 1920 as well as in the team competition 1924.

References

1895 births
1968 deaths
Gymnasts from Milan
Italian male artistic gymnasts
Gymnasts at the 1920 Summer Olympics
Gymnasts at the 1924 Summer Olympics
Gymnasts at the 1928 Summer Olympics
Olympic gymnasts of Italy
Olympic gold medalists for Italy
Olympic medalists in gymnastics
Medalists at the 1924 Summer Olympics
Medalists at the 1920 Summer Olympics